Arcade Publishing is an independent trade publishing company that started in 1988 in New York, USA. It publishes American and world fiction and nonfiction.

The company was started and run by Richard Seaver and his wife Jeannette. It declared bankruptcy shortly after Richard's death in 2009, and was acquired by Skyhorse Publishing in 2010.

In 2011, Arcade was relaunched as an imprint of Skyhorse Publishing, where it continues to acquire and publish literary fiction and nonfiction. In addition to its main list, Arcade now also issues Arcade Artists & Art, a series featuring books by and about artists, particularly of the modern period. Jeannette Seaver serves as a consulting editor in the acquisition and curation of upcoming lists.

Auschwitz by Miklos Nyiszli became a New York Times bestseller in 2011.<ref>(August 28, 2011). "Best Sellers". The New York Times".</ref> The company has also published a number of books by Albanian author Ismail Kadare, including Elegy for Kosovo, The Successor, Spring Flowers, Spring Frost, Agamemnon's Daughter, The File on H., The Pyramid, and The Three-Arched Bridge''.

References

External links 
Arcade Publishing web site

Defunct book publishing companies of the United States
Publishing companies established in 1988
1988 establishments in the United States